Pearce Nuget Chiles (May 28, 1867 – December 11, 1933), nicknamed "What's The Use", was an American professional baseball player who played as both an outfielder and infielder in the Major Leagues from 1899-1900 for the Philadelphia Phillies.

During his time with the Phillies as a 3rd base coach, he became infamous for his role in sign stealing. Among others, Cincinnati Reds shortstop Tommy Corcoran noticed that Chiles' leg twitched, but only at the Baker Bowl and only when he stood in the same omnipresent puddle which seemed to persist even when it didn't rain. On September 17, 1900, Corcoran ran to where Chiles was standing and kicked his cleats in the dirt until he found a wooden box with protruding wires. Through this device, someone in the stadium was stealing opponents’ pitch signs and signaling Chiles via electrical pulses from the box. Chiles then verbally fed the pitch to the batter. Upon discovery, the umpire made Chiles change places, but no further penalties or fines were ever assessed.

References

External links

1867 births
Major League Baseball outfielders
Major League Baseball infielders
Baseball players from Missouri
19th-century baseball players
Philadelphia Phillies players
Lawrence Jayhawks players
St. Joseph Saints players
Galveston Sand Crabs players
Scranton Miners players
Waco Tigers players
People from Henry County, Missouri
1933 deaths
Topeka Capitals players
American sportspeople convicted of crimes